SETAR N.V., is the privatised full telecommunications service provider for the island of Aruba.  The services provided by SETAR include: telephone, internet and GSM-related wireless services. SETAR also owns Telearuba.
SETAR has been in operation on Aruba for over 10 years. Annual sales are offered by SETAR, especially during the holidays.

References

External links 
SETAR N.V. Homepage

Communications in Aruba
Companies of Aruba
Mobile phone companies of the Caribbean